The Copenhagen Half Marathon is an annual half marathon road running event which takes place in September on the city streets of Copenhagen, Denmark, first held in 2015. It is a World Athletics Gold Label Road Race, making it the foremost race of its type in the country.  The race features both public and professional elements.

The Copenhagen Half Marathon is the largest annual road running event in the city, followed by the more established Copenhagen Marathon, which has been held there since 1980.  Geoffrey Kamworor set the half marathon world record during this race with a time of 58:01 in 2019.

History 
The event was launched after the success holding of the 2014 IAAF World Half Marathon Championships in the city. The course was slightly modified for the newly created annual event, with the race starting and finishing near Parken Stadium.

Nearly 20,000 runners took part in the inaugural edition in 2015.  The first winners were both Kenyan, with Bedan Karoki Muchiri taking the men's race in 59:14 minutes and Purity Cherotich Rionoripo being the women's winner in 68:29 minutes.

Over 22,000 runners took part in the 2016 edition. The winners were James Mwangi Wangari from Kenya taking the men's race in 59:07 minutes and Purity Cherotich Rionoripo from Ethiopia being the women's winner in 68:00 minutes, both beating the existing course record.

It held the IAAF Silver Label Road Race status in 2016 and the IAAF Gold Label Road Race in 2017.

The 2020 edition of the race was cancelled due to the coronavirus pandemic, with all registrants given the option of transferring their entry to 2021 or obtaining a refund.

Winners 
Key:

Notes

References

External links
Official website

Half marathons
Sports competitions in Copenhagen
Athletics competitions in Denmark
Recurring sporting events established in 2015
2015 establishments in Denmark
Annual events in Denmark
September sporting events
Autumn events in Denmark